is a Japanese footballer currently playing as a centre back for J2 League club Vegalta Sendai, on loan from Gamba Osaka.

Career statistics

Club
.

Notes

References

External links

1998 births
Living people
People from Kunitachi, Tokyo
Association football people from Tokyo Metropolis
Meiji University alumni
Japanese footballers
Association football defenders
J1 League players
J2 League players
Gamba Osaka players
Vegalta Sendai players